Six's maximum and minimum thermometer is a registering thermometer that can record the maximum and minimum temperatures reached over a period of time, for example 24 hours. It is used to record the extremes of temperature at a location, for instance in meteorology and horticulture. It was invented by the  British scientist James Six,  in 1780; the same basic design remains in use.

It is also commonly known as a maximum–minimum, minimum–maximum, maxima–minima or minima–maxima  thermometer, of which it is the earliest practical design.

The thermometer indicates the current temperature, and the highest and lowest temperatures since the last reset.

Description

Six's Maximum and Minimum thermometer consists of a U-shaped  glass tube with two separate temperature scales set along each arm of the U. One of these is for recording the maximum temperature encountered and the other for the minimum temperature. The arms of the U-shaped tube terminate in sealed glass bulbs.  The bulb at the top of the minimum reading scale arm is full of  alcohol, while the other contains a vacuum (or low pressure alcohol vapour).

In the bend of the U is a section of mercury, a metal that is liquid at ambient temperatures. This is pushed around by the thermal expansion and contraction of the alcohol in the first bulb as it responds to the external temperature. The vacuum in the other bulb allows free movement of the alcohol and mercury. It is the alcohol that measures the temperature; the mercury indicates the temperature reading on both scales.  This is unlike a normal mercury thermometer, in which the expansion and contraction of mercury itself indicate temperature.

The thermometer shows a reading at the top of the mercury section on both the maximum and minimum scales; this shows the current temperature and should be the same on both scales. If the two readings are not the same, then the instrument scales are not correctly positioned or the instrument is damaged.

The maximum and minimum readings are recorded by two small steel markers which are sprung into the capillary tube so that they can slide, but only if a force is applied to them, either by being pushed by the mercury or under the influence of an external magnet.

Before a new maximum or minimum reading can be taken, the thermometer must be reset by moving the markers to the top of the mercury, usually by hand using a small magnet to slide them along the tube. Any change in temperature after that will push one of the markers along with it. (If the markers are not reset, they will register maxima and minima only if they exceed the values already encountered.)

If the temperature rises, the maximum scale marker will be pushed. If it falls, the moving mercury will push the minimum scale marker. As the temperature varies, the markers will remain in their positions unless the temperature becomes higher (for maximum) or lower (for minimum) than already recorded, in which case the relevant marker is pushed further. The markers thus record the furthest point reached by the mercury in each arm of the tube, and thereby the highest and lowest temperatures since the last reset. Typically the thermometer is reset every 24 hours to measure the diurnal temperature variation, the positions of the ends of the markers nearest to the mercury are examined. Their positions on the maximum and minimum scales show the highest and lowest temperatures encountered since the last reset.

Design variations
In a variation of design, some models have unsprung markers held in place by a magnetic plate located behind the card showing the scales and close enough to the U-shaped tube to hold the markers in place unless they are pushed by the thermal expansion of the device. When manual control is operated, the plate is pushed away from the U-shaped tube, freeing the markers which then drop under gravity to the surface of the mercury.

Another design has the U orientated horizontally and the markers completely free and unsprung. The reset is carried out by turning the U to the vertical so the markers sink to rest on the mercury, and returning it to the horizontal.

Mercury-free maximum–minimum thermometers 
The original Six's thermometer design contains mercury, which has been banned for most uses in the European Union and some other parts of the world.

In 2006, S.Brannan & Sons Ltd, a UK company, was granted a patent for a mercury-free version of Six's maximum-minimum thermometer: instead of mercury two immiscible liquids are used supporting an index. The thermometer operates in the same way as the mercury version.

Electronic thermometers often include a maximum-minimum registering feature.

See also
     Maximum minimum temperature system

References

 Two hundred years of the Six's Self Registering Thermometer  Austin and McConnell,  Notes and Records of the Royal Society of London * Volume. 35, No. 1, July., 1980 at JSTOR
 A History of the Thermometer and Its Uses in Meteorology by Amit Batra, Johns Hopkins University Press, 1966; 
 The Construction of a Thermometer by James Six, Nimbus Publishing Ltd,1980;

External links
 Article on Six's thermometer at the Museum of the History of Science at Florence, Italy
 Explanation of the working of Six's thermometer
 

Thermometers